Hamad Al Fardan (born June 29, 1987 in Manama), is a Bahraini racing driver and musician. He is the first Bahraini to drive at GP2 Series level.

Racing career

Formula BMW
Al Fardan is the son of rally driver Ahmed Al Fardan. His first experience of formula racing came in 2004, when he drove in the Formula BMW Asia series. In 2005, he undertook a full season in the championship with the Malaysian team Meritus and finished third overall.  He also raced in the Formula BMW World Final, finishing in eighteenth position. For 2006, he returned to the series for two races only due to commitments in other championships, winning both of them.

Formula Renault
Al Fardan competed in the Formula Asia V6 Renault championship in 2006, finishing the championship in sixth place with one win despite missing the last four races of the season. He again raced for the Meritus team. He returned to the series for 2009 and won the opening four races before the remainder of the season was cancelled, leaving him champion by default.

Toyota Racing Series
Al Fardan also drove in the New Zealand-based Toyota Racing Series for 2006, again employed by Meritus. Scoring one race victory, the New Zealand Grand Prix, he finished thirteenth in the championship. He remained in the formula for 2007, although he switched teams to Mark Petch Motorsport. In this year he won two races and moved up to eleventh place in the championship. It was a hectic season for Al Fardan, as he also competed in British Formula 3 on the other side of the world.

Formula Three
Al Fardan moved to the National Class of the British Formula 3 Championship for 2007 (in addition to his TRS commitments), where he established himself as a frontrunner in the series. He finished third in the championship for the Performance Racing team, despite not winning a race.

Over the winter of 2007–08, he moved to the Asian Formula Three Championship, driving for a national team sponsored by the Arabian bank Gulf House Finance. He won both rounds of the season-opener at the Sepang circuit in Malaysia, and two further races, but then accused the team of fastest man, Frédéric Vervisch, of cheating. He declined to make a protest preferring to walk away. He finished fourth in the championship. Following his performance in 2007, Toyota F1 test driver Kamui Kobayashi tipped him to become the first Middle Eastern driver to make it to Formula One.

Al Fardan moved to the German ATS Formel 3 Cup for 2008, where he was placed eleventh in the final standings, although his season was disrupted by injury.

GP2 Series
Al Fardan signed for the iSport International team to compete in the 2008–09 GP2 Asia Series season, becoming the first Bahraini and Arabian driver to race at this level. His backing from Gulf Finance House also meant that the team changed its name to GFH Team iSport for the duration of the championship. He finished 20th in the championship standings, scoring two points. He has not raced since, despite being linked to a 2010 Auto GP drive with DAMS.

Racing record

Career summary

Complete GP2 Asia Series results
(key) (Races in bold indicate pole position) (Races in italics indicate fastest lap)

References
Career statistics from driverdb.com.  Retrieved on September 26, 2008.

External links
Official website

1987 births
Living people
Bahraini racing drivers
German Formula Three Championship drivers
Asian Formula Three Championship drivers
British Formula Three Championship drivers
Formula V6 Asia drivers
Formula BMW Asia drivers
Speedcar Series drivers
Toyota Racing Series drivers
GP2 Asia Series drivers
Sportspeople from Manama
Bahraini hip hop musicians
Team Meritus drivers
Performance Racing drivers
ISport International drivers
Durango drivers